Hendricus Wessel (17 December 1887 – 4 August 1977) was a Dutch long-distance runner. He competed in the marathon at the 1920 Summer Olympics.

References

External links
 

1887 births
1977 deaths
Athletes (track and field) at the 1920 Summer Olympics
Dutch male long-distance runners
Dutch male marathon runners
Olympic athletes of the Netherlands
Athletes from Amsterdam